Karl Ellis Gillespie is a Republican member of the North Carolina House of Representatives who has represented the 120th district (including all of Cherokee, Clay, Graham, and Macon counties) since 2021. Gillespie previously served on the Macon County board of commissioners from 2016 to 2020.

Electoral history

Committee assignments

2021-2022 session
Federal Relations and American Indian Affairs (Vice chair)
Agriculture 
Wildlife Resources Committee (Vice chair)
Appropriations 
Appropriations - Education

References

External links
Campaign Website

Living people
People from Franklin, North Carolina
1962 births
County commissioners in North Carolina
Republican Party members of the North Carolina House of Representatives
21st-century American politicians